Events from the year 1795 in the Batavian Republic

Events

 - Batavian Revolution in Amsterdam
 - Kew Letters
 - Treaty of The Hague (1795)

Births

Deaths

References

1795 in the Batavian Republic
1790s in the Batavian Republic
Years of the 18th century in the Batavian Republic